Fairmile may refer to:

 Fairmile, Blandford Forum, a neighbourhood/hamlet
 Fairmile, Cobham, a neighbourhood/hamlet
 Fairmile, Devon, a large, remote hamlet
 Fairmile, Dorset, a village/hamlet/suburb
 Fairmile, Henley-on-Thames, a neighbourhood/hamlet
 Fairmile Hospital, a former lunatic asylum
 Fairmile Marine, a British boat builder:
Fairmile A motor launch
Fairmile B motor launch
Fairmile C motor gun boat
Fairmile D motor torpedo boat
Fairmile H landing craft
 Fairmile Engineering Company, manufacturer of the British automobile Railton

See also